The 1966–67 season of the Philadelphia 76ers was their 14th season in the National Basketball Association (NBA) and their 4th since moving from Syracuse (as well as their final season at the Philadelphia Civic Center, before moving to the Spectrum in South Philadelphia the next season).

This season set a record in winning percentage and they won the NBA Finals for the franchise's second championship and first in Philadelphia. This team was later chosen as the greatest individual team in 1980 for the NBA 35th Anniversary Team.

During the off-season, the 76ers dismissed head coach & former 76ers (Syracuse Nationals) player Dolph Schayes. Alex Hannum, (a former 1950s power forward, who was the last man to coach a winner past the Boston Celtics) was the new coach. The 43-year-old Hannum looked like he could still play, and often ran with the club in practice.

Wilt Chamberlain's 8 assists per game set a record for centers and made him 3rd in the NBA overall while scoring 24 points per game and once again leading the NBA in rebounds and blocked shots (though not yet officially recorded).
Shooting less, he made a league-record 68% of his shots; his 875 free throw attempts, another league record, offset his terrible percentage from the foul line.

The 76ers also had three other players around the 20-point-per-game mark that season in Hal Greer with 22 points & Chet Walker & Billy Cunningham with 19 points each. The four players combined  (as well as the rest of the roster) won a then-league-record 68 games together under Hannum's watch. The team averaged a record 125 points per game, leading all teams in shooting accuracy.

The 76ers started the season at 46–4, which remains the best 50-game start in the NBA history (though tied in the Warriors 2015-16 season). They finished the season at 68–13, the best record in league history at the time. In the 1st round of the playoffs, they swept the Cincinnati Royals, then in the Eastern Conference Finals, defeated the Boston Celtics  (a team that had won 8 consecutive titles & 9 out of the last 10) 4 games to 1. In the Finals, they defeated the San Francisco Warriors, 4 games to 2.

In 1996, the 1966-67 76ers were named as one of the Top 10 Teams in NBA History. They averaged over 125 points per game in 81 regular season contests, still the third highest scoring team in league history for the regular season, and first among NBA Champions.

Offseason

NBA Draft

Roster

Regular season

Season standings

Record vs. opponents

Game log

|-align="center" bgcolor="bbffbb"
| 1 || October 15 || New York Knicks || 128–112 || 1–0 || Won 1
|-align="center" bgcolor="bbffbb"
| 2 || October 21 || St. Louis Hawks || 119–110 || 2–0 || Won 2
|-align="center" bgcolor="bbffbb"
| 3 || October 22 || @ Baltimore Bullets || 141–112 || 3–0 || Won 3
|-align="center" bgcolor="bbffbb"
| 4 || October 25 || Baltimore Bullets || 130–110 || 4–0 || Won 4
|-align="center" bgcolor="bbffbb"
| 5 || October 29 || Boston Celtics || 138–96 || 5–0 || Won 5
|-

|-align="center" bgcolor="bbffbb"
| 6 || November 3 || vs St. Louis Hawks || 120–108 || 6–0 || Won 6
|-align="center" bgcolor="bbffbb"
| 7 || November 4 || San Francisco Warriors || 134–129 || 7–0 || Won 7
|-align="center" bgcolor="edbebf"
| 8 || November 5 || @ Boston Celtics || 87–105 || 7–1 || Lost 1
|-align="center" bgcolor="bbffbb"
| 9 || November 8 || vs Detroit Pistons || 118–100 || 8–1 || Won 1
|-align="center" bgcolor="bbffbb"
| 10 || November 11 || Chicago Bulls || 126–113 || 9–1 || Won 2
|-align="center" bgcolor="bbffbb"
| 11 || November 12 || @ Cincinnati Royals || 112–98 || 10–1 || Won 3
|-align="center" bgcolor="bbffbb"
| 12 || November 13 || @ Chicago Bulls || 132–126 || 11–1 || Won 4
|-align="center" bgcolor="bbffbb"
| 13 || November 15 || @ New York Knicks || 113–109 || 12–1 || Won 5
|-align="center" bgcolor="bbffbb"
| 14 || November 16 || New York Knicks || 117–108 || 13–1 || Won 6
|-align="center" bgcolor="bbffbb"
| 15 || November 18 || vs Chicago Bulls || 145–120 || 14–1 || Won 7
|-align="center" bgcolor="bbffbb"
| 16 || November 19 || Cincinnati Royals || 134–110 || 15–1 || Won 8
|-align="center" bgcolor="edbebf"
| 17 || November 23 || @ Cincinnati Royals || 106–111 || 15–2 || Lost 1
|-align="center" bgcolor="bbffbb"
| 18 || November 24 || San Francisco Warriors || 140–123 || 16–2 || Won 1
|-align="center" bgcolor="bbffbb"
| 19 || November 25 || @ Baltimore Bullets || 129–115 || 17–2 || Won 2
|-align="center" bgcolor="bbffbb"
| 20 || November 26 || Detroit Pistons || 131–123 || 18–2 || Won 3
|-align="center" bgcolor="bbffbb"
| 21 || November 29 || St. Louis Hawks || 137–116 || 19–2 || Won 4
|-align="center" bgcolor="bbffbb"
| 22 || November 30 || @ Detroit Pistons || 128–119 || 20–2 || Won 5
|-

|-align="center" bgcolor="bbffbb"
| 23 || December 2 || Los Angeles Lakers || 138–130 || 21–2 || Won 6
|-align="center" bgcolor="bbffbb"
| 24 || December 3 || @ Baltimore Bullets || 137–120 || 22–2 || Won 7
|-align="center" bgcolor="bbffbb"
| 25 || December 6 || Chicago Bulls || 129–119 || 23–2 || Won 8
|-align="center" bgcolor="bbffbb"
| 26 || December 7 || @ Chicago Bulls || 117–103 || 24–2 || Won 9
|-align="center" bgcolor="bbffbb"
| 27 || December 9 || New York Knicks || 112–107 || 25–2 || Won 10
|-align="center" bgcolor="bbffbb"
| 28 || December 10 || @ St. Louis Hawks || 133–123 || 26–2 || Won 11
|-align="center" bgcolor="edbebf"
| 29 || December 11 || @ Boston Celtics || 103–117 || 26–3 || Lost 1
|-align="center" bgcolor="bbffbb"
| 30 || December 13 || @ New York Knicks || 127–112 || 27–3 || Won 1
|-align="center" bgcolor="bbffbb"
| 31 || December 16 || St. Louis Hawks || 124–113 || 28–3 || Won 2
|-align="center" bgcolor="bbffbb"
| 32 || December 17 || vs Detroit Pistons || 120–105 || 29–3 || Won 3
|-align="center" bgcolor="bbffbb"
| 33 || December 21 || @ Los Angeles Lakers || 129–123 || 30–3 || Won 4
|-align="center" bgcolor="bbffbb"
| 34 || December 22 || @ San Francisco Warriors	 || 116–114 || 31–3 || Won 5
|-align="center" bgcolor="bbffbb"
| 35 || December 23 || @ Los Angeles Lakers || 118–107 || 32–3 || Won 6
|-align="center" bgcolor="bbffbb"
| 36 || December 26 || Cincinnati Royals || 134–118 || 33–3 || Won 7
|-align="center" bgcolor="bbffbb"
| 37 || December 28 || Boston Celtics || 113–108 || 34–3 || Won 8
|-align="center" bgcolor="bbffbb"
| 38 || December 30 || vs Detroit Pistons || 137–113 || 35–3 || Won 9
|-

|-align="center" bgcolor="bbffbb"
| 39 || January 3 || @ New York Knicks || 148–142 (OT) || 36–3 || Won 10
|-align="center" bgcolor="bbffbb"
| 40 || January 4 || Chicago Bulls || 136–115 || 37–3 || Won 11
|-align="center" bgcolor="edbebf"
| 41 || January 5 || vs New York Knicks || 104–112 || 37–4 || Lost 1
|-align="center" bgcolor="bbffbb"
| 42 || January 6 || Baltimore Bullets || 121–115 (OT) || 38–4 || Won 1
|-align="center" bgcolor="bbffbb"
| 43 || January 8 || @ Chicago Bulls || 117–108 || 39–4 || Won 2
|-align="center" bgcolor="bbffbb"
| 44 || January 13 || St. Louis Hawks || 125–107 || 40–4 || Won 3
|-align="center" bgcolor="bbffbb"
| 45 || January 15 || @ Boston Celtics || 110–95 || 41–4 || Won 4
|-align="center" bgcolor="bbffbb"
| 46 || January 17 || New York Knicks || 119–111 || 42–4 || Won 5
|-align="center" bgcolor="bbffbb"
| 47 || January 18 || @ Detroit Pistons || 113–105 || 43–4 || Won 6
|-align="center" bgcolor="bbffbb"
| 48 || January 19 || vs Chicago Bulls || 127–102 || 44–4 || Won 7
|-align="center" bgcolor="bbffbb"
| 49 || January 20 || Los Angeles Lakers || 119–108 || 45–4 || Won 8
|-align="center" bgcolor="bbffbb"
| 50 || January 23 || vs St. Louis Hawks || 112–105 || 46–4 || Won 9
|-align="center" bgcolor="edbebf"
| 51 || January 24 || Boston Celtics || 106–118 || 46–5 || Lost 1
|-align="center" bgcolor="bbffbb"
| 52 || January 27 || Cincinnati Royals || 110–107 || 47–5 || Won 1
|-align="center" bgcolor="edbebf"
| 53 || January 29 || @ St. Louis Hawks || 108–114 || 47–6 || Lost 1
|-

|-align="center" bgcolor="edbebf"
| 54 || February 1 || @ Los Angeles Lakers || 133–143 || 47–7 || Lost 2
|-align="center" bgcolor="edbebf"
| 55 || February 2 || vs San Francisco Warriors || 120–137 || 47–8 || Lost 3
|-align="center" bgcolor="bbffbb"
| 56 || February 4 || vs San Francisco Warriors || 140–127 || 48–8 || Won 1
|-align="center" bgcolor="bbffbb"
| 57 || February 5 || @ Los Angeles Lakers || 130–123 || 49–8 || Won 2
|-align="center" bgcolor="bbffbb"
| 58 || February 7 || vs San Francisco Warriors || 126–123 || 50–8 || Won 3
|-align="center" bgcolor="bbffbb"
| 59 || February 8 || @ Cincinnati Royals || 118–106 || 51–8 || Won 4
|-align="center" bgcolor="bbffbb"
| 60 || February 10 || Los Angeles Lakers || 148–131 || 52–8 || Won 5
|-align="center" bgcolor="edbebf"
| 61 || February 11 || @ Baltimore Bullets || 133–139 || 52–9 || Lost 1
|-align="center" bgcolor="edbebf"
| 62 || February 12 || @ Boston Celtics || 112–113 || 52–10 || Lost 2
|-align="center" bgcolor="bbffbb"
| 63 || February 13 || Cincinnati Royals || 131–123 || 53–10 || Won 1
|-align="center" bgcolor="bbffbb"
| 64 || February 15 || @ Detroit Pistons || 127–121 || 54–10 || Won 2
|-align="center" bgcolor="bbffbb"
| 65 || February 17 || vs Cincinnati Royals || 127–118 || 55–10 || Won 3
|-align="center" bgcolor="bbffbb"
| 66 || February 19 || @ St. Louis Hawks || 123–122 || 56–10 || Won 4
|-align="center" bgcolor="bbffbb"
| 67 || February 24 || vs Baltimore Bullets || 149–118 || 57–10 || Won 5
|-align="center" bgcolor="bbffbb"
| 68 || February 28 || vs Cincinnati Royals || 127–107 || 58–10 || Won 6
|-

|-align="center" bgcolor="edbebf"
| 69 || March 1 || vs Chicago Bulls || 122–129 || 58–11 || Lost 1
|-align="center" bgcolor="bbffbb"
| 70 || March 2 || San Francisco Warriors || 136–128 || 59–11 || Won 1
|-align="center" bgcolor="bbffbb"
| 71 || March 3 || vs Detroit Pistons || 129–103 || 60–11 || Won 2
|-align="center" bgcolor="bbffbb"
| 72 || March 5 || Detroit Pistons || 131–106 || 61–11 || Won 3
|-align="center" bgcolor="bbffbb"
| 73 || March 6 || vs Los Angeles Lakers || 119–117 || 62–11 || Won 4
|-align="center" bgcolor="bbffbb"
| 74 || March 8 || @ Boston Celtics || 115–113 (OT) || 63–11 || Won 5
|-align="center" bgcolor="edbebf"
| 75 || March 11 || Boston Celtics || 114–116 || 63–12 || Lost 1
|-align="center" bgcolor="bbffbb"
| 76 || March 12 || @ New York Knicks || 131–120 || 64–12 || Won 1
|-align="center" bgcolor="bbffbb"
| 77 || March 14 || @ San Francisco Warriors || 139–110 || 65–12 || Won 2
|-align="center" bgcolor="bbffbb"
| 78 || March 15 || @ Los Angeles Lakers || 138–123 || 66–12 || Won 3
|-align="center" bgcolor="edbebf"
| 79 || March 16 || @ San Francisco Warriors || 131–145 || 66–13 || Lost 1
|-align="center" bgcolor="bbffbb"
| 80 || March 18 || Baltimore Bullets || 135–119 || 67–13 || Won 1
|-align="center" bgcolor="bbffbb"
| 81 || March 19 || @ Baltimore Bullets || 132–129 || 68–13 || Won 2
|-

|-
| Season schedule

Player stats
Note: GP= Games played; PTS= Points; REB= Rebounds; AST= Assists; BLK= Blocks; STL= Steals;

Playoffs

|- align="center" bgcolor="#ffcccc"
| 1
| March 21
| Cincinnati
| L 116–120
| Wilt Chamberlain (41)
| Wilt Chamberlain (22)
| Chamberlain, Greer (5)
| Philadelphia Convention Hall5,097
| 0–1
|- align="center" bgcolor="#ccffcc"
| 2
| March 22
| @ Cincinnati
| W 123–102
| Wilt Chamberlain (37)
| Wilt Chamberlain (27)
| Wilt Chamberlain (11)
| Cincinnati Gardens5,276
| 1–1
|- align="center" bgcolor="#ccffcc"
| 3
| March 24
| Cincinnati
| W 121–106
| Hal Greer (33)
| Wilt Chamberlain (30)
| Wilt Chamberlain (19)
| Philadelphia Convention Hall8,987
| 2–1
|- align="center" bgcolor="#ccffcc"
| 4
| March 25
| @ Cincinnati
| W 112–94
| Hal Greer (30)
| Wilt Chamberlain (27)
| Wilt Chamberlain (9)
| Cincinnati Gardens2,624
| 3–1
|-

|- align="center" bgcolor="#ccffcc"
| 1
| March 31
| Boston
| W 127–113
| Hal Greer (39)
| Wilt Chamberlain (32)
| Wilt Chamberlain (13)
| Palestra9,239
| 1–0
|- align="center" bgcolor="#ccffcc"
| 2
| April 2
| @ Boston
| W 107–102
| Chet Walker (23)
| Wilt Chamberlain (29)
| Chamberlain, Greer (5)
| Boston Garden13,909
| 2–0
|- align="center" bgcolor="#ccffcc"
| 3
| April 5
| Boston
| W 115–104
| Hal Greer (30)
| Wilt Chamberlain (41)
| Wilt Chamberlain (9)
| Philadelphia Convention Hall13,007
| 3–0
|- align="center" bgcolor="#ffcccc"
| 4
| April 9
| @ Boston
| L 117–121
| Luke Jackson (29)
| Wilt Chamberlain (22)
| Wilt Chamberlain (10)
| Boston Garden13,909
| 3–1
|- align="center" bgcolor="#ccffcc"
| 5
| April 11
| Boston
| W 140–116
| Hal Greer (32)
| Wilt Chamberlain (36)
| Wilt Chamberlain (13)
| Philadelphia Convention Hall13,007
| 4–1
|-

|- align="center" bgcolor="#ccffcc"
| 1
| April 14
| San Francisco
| W 141–135 (OT)
| Hal Greer (32)
| Wilt Chamberlain (33)
| Wilt Chamberlain (10)
| Philadelphia Convention Hall9,283
| 1–0
|- align="center" bgcolor="#ccffcc"
| 2
| April 16
| San Francisco
| W 126–95
| Hal Greer (30)
| Wilt Chamberlain (38)
| Wilt Chamberlain (10)
| Philadelphia Convention Hall9,426
| 2–0
|- align="center" bgcolor="#ffcccc"
| 3
| April 18
| @ San Francisco
| L 124–130
| Wilt Chamberlain (26)
| Wilt Chamberlain (26)
| Wali Jones (7)
| Cow Palace14,773
| 2–1
|- align="center" bgcolor="#ccffcc"
| 4
| April 20
| @ San Francisco
| W 122–108
| Hal Greer (38)
| Wilt Chamberlain (27)
| Wilt Chamberlain (8)
| Cow Palace15,117
| 3–1
|- align="center" bgcolor="#ffcccc"
| 5
| April 23
| San Francisco
| L 109–117
| Chet Walker (25)
| Wilt Chamberlain (24)
| Hal Greer (7)
| Philadelphia Convention Hall10,229
| 3–2
|- align="center" bgcolor="#ccffcc"
| 6
| April 24
| @ San Francisco
| W 125–122
| Wali Jones (27)
| Wilt Chamberlain (23)
| Hal Greer (7)
| Cow Palace15,612
| 4–2
|-

Awards and Records
Wilt Chamberlain, NBA Most Valuable Player Award
Wilt Chamberlain, All-NBA First Team
Hal Greer, All-NBA Second Team

References

 Philadelphia 76ers on Basketball Reference

Philadelphia 76ers seasons
NBA championship seasons
Philadelphia
Philadel
Philadel